The 1994–95 Tampico Madero-TM Gallos Blancos season is the 4th campaign in existence and first season in the top flight division of Mexican football. The campaign is best remembered as the last season played in First Division.

Summary
After the team was promoted from Second Division in summertime Owner Antonio Pelaez Pier reinforced the squad with several transfers in: Héctor Quintero (Veracruz), Ángel Torres (Puebla), Alejandro Domínguez (América), René Isidoro García (Atlante), Tomás Cruz (Atlante), Gerardo Silva (América), Álvaro Torres (Santos), Gerardo Jiménez (Monterrey), Guillermo Galindo (Querétaro) and Rubén Martínez (Santos). Club legend Forward Sergio Lira left the club transferred out to Puebla FC. Also Jose Camacho in his second season as manager renew his contract until 1995 along Panamanian Forward Victor Rene Mendieta.

The squad lost 9 matches in its first 15 games collapsing in the relegation table below Toros Neza. On 20 November 1994 the municipal government of Tampico sanctioned the club allegedly due to Pelaez did not pay the lease of Tamaulipas Stadium and banned the team to play at that field. The match on 19 November 1994 against Toros Neza was in fact the last First Division game played in the port.

After the ban, in a shockingly move, Owner Pelaez Pier transferred the franchise out from Tampico to Queretaro and leased the Corregidora Stadium until June 1995. Also, the team left its name Tampico Madero and was renamed TM-Gallos Blancos and even Pelaez sacked Jose Camacho as manager appointing Juan de Dios Castillo.

However, the squad collapsed for the second half of the season and on 2 April 1995 after a 0-1 defeat against CD Guadalajara the club was relegated to Primera Division A after just one single season.

Squad

Transfers

Winter

Competitions

La Liga

League table

Group 1

Overall Table

Results by round

Matches

Statistics

Goalscorers 
8. Marcelino Bernal

References

External links

1994–95 Mexican Primera División season
Tampico Madero F.C.